The Warfalla is an arab  tribe that resides in the west of Libya, in the town of Bani Walid, their stronghold. Usually estimated to be Libya’s largest tribe with up to one million of the total population of about 6 million people, they are also known as the strongest tribe in Libya with the manpower and equipment they have. Warfalla historically inhabited the area bounded by the cities of Bani Walid, Sirte, and Benghazi as well as the town of Sabha.

The Warfalla tribe is considered more of a confederacy of 52 sub-tribes that consist of individual bayts or clans,
During the Italian invasion of Libya the Warfalla tribe, under the leadership of Bel Khayre, fought against the invaders until the fall of Bani Walid, the Warfalla tribe's territory in December 1923. There was a civil war between the tribes and peasants of the Jabal al Gharbi District from 1920 to 1922.

Role in the Gaddafi regime 
The Warfalla, together with the Qadhafa and the Magarha, were traditionally considered the pillars of Gaddafi’s rule, dominating the security services and the ranks of the military. Gaddafi drew many of his security personnel from the Warfalla tribe, and placed certain Warfalla leaders in his "revolutionary committees" (besides members of the Maqarha and his own Qadhafa tribe), a paramilitary force entrusted with securing loyalty to the Qaddafis, by force if necessary.

However, this support has been inconsistent, most notably in the mounting of the 1993 Libyan coup attempt by Warfalla members of Gaddafi’s government in 1993, as a result of their rivalry with the Magarha for top positions within the government, the failure of the coup attempt to overthrow Gaddafi resulted in a temporary decline of Warfalla influence in the Libyan power structure, as many leading members were purged and a number of Warfalla leaders and civilians were either imprisoned or executed.

Role in the 2011 civil war 
In the early weeks of February 2011 Libyan Civil War the Warfalla tribe leaders gave their support to the Gaddafi regime, but while the tribe has often been identified with the Gaddafi regime, there were many Warfalla who actively opposed his rule, including Mahmoud Jibril (el-Warfally), the titular head of the opposition National Transitional Council (NTC).

Akram al-Warfelli, a leading figure of the tribe, called for Gaddafi to stand down in late February 2011. “We tell the brother, he’s no longer a brother, we tell him to leave the country,” he told Al-Jazeera. On the 28-29 of May, over 100 tribal leaders, most of them Warfalla, met to call for an end to the fighting in Libya and the removal of Mu'ammar Qaddafi and his sons from the Libyan government.

Notable Warfalla 

 Mahmoud Jibril – Libyan politician, Prime Minister of National Transitional Council
 Mahmoud al-Werfalli – Libyan general, commander of al-Saiqa

References 

di Agostini, Col. Enrico, Popolazione della Tripolitania, Tripoli, 1917.
Renee Montagne and Lourdes Garcia-Navarro, "Libyan Rebel Leader's Death Spurs Opposition Infighting," National Public Radio (NPR) (August 1, 2011).

External links

 Libya - Tribal Rivalries, APS Diplomat Redrawing the Islamic Map (October 14, 2002)

Tribes of Libya
Arabized Berbers